The Power Macintosh 5400 (also sold under variations of the name Performa 5400) is a personal computer designed, manufactured and sold by Apple Computer from April 1996 to March 1998.  The 5400 is an all-in-one computer with an integrated monitor, and replaced the Power Macintosh 5200 LC in that role. It is largely identical to the Power Macintosh 6400 internally, which is essentially the same computer (the "Alchemy" platform) in a tower case. This is the first all-in-one Macintosh to support PCI expansion, replacing the Processor Direct Slot.

Unlike other Power Macintosh machines of the time, the 5400 was only sold to education markets.  Macintosh Performa-branded variants were generally only sold in Europe, Asia and Australia while the less-powerful Performa 5300CD remained on sale in the Americas for much of 1996.  This reflected a de-emphasizing of sales of all-in-one form factor computers into the consumer market, something Apple stopped doing altogether until the introduction of the iMac G3 in the second half of 1998.

The more powerful Power Macintosh 5500 was introduced in April 1997, and both computers continued to be sold alongside each other.  When the education-only Power Macintosh G3 All-In-One was introduced in early 1998, the 5400 and 5500 were both discontinued.

Models

Introduced April 15, 1996:
 Power Macintosh 5400/120: Base education version with 16 MB RAM and a 120 MHz processor.

Introduced April 22, 1996:
 Macintosh Performa 5400CD: Consumer version of the 5400/120.
 Macintosh Performa 5410CD: Ethernet-less version of the 5400CD. Not sold in the U.S..
 Macintosh Performa 5420CD: Not sold in the U.S.

Introduced August 5, 1996:
 Macintosh Performa 5400/160: Asia- and Europe-only version with a 160 MHz CPU.
 Macintosh Performa 5400/180 (DE): Asia- and Europe-only 180 MHz variant in a black case. The "DE" (Director's Edition) was available only in Australia and had 24 MB of RAM, a built in TV tuner with remote control,  and a bigger hard drive.

Introduced October 1, 1996:
 Power Macintosh 5400/180: Same, but with a 180 MHz processor.

Introduced November 12, 1996:
 Macintosh Performa 5430: Asia- and Europe-only variant of the 5400/160, but with 24 MB RAM.
 Macintosh Performa 5440: Asia- and Europe-only variant of the 5400/180, only in a normal grey case.

Introduced February 17, 1997:
 Power Macintosh 5400/200: Education version with 24 MB RAM and a 200 MHz processor

Timeline

References

External links 
 Power Macintosh 5400 at lowendmac.com

5400
Macintosh Performa
5400
Macintosh all-in-ones
Computer-related introductions in 1996